George Abbitt (also George Abbott) (16341689)  was a founding settler of Norwalk, Connecticut.

He was the son of Maurice and Gertrude Abbott of England.

He originally settled in Windsor, as an indentured servant. He apparently was sanctioned for selling ammunition to the natives, which was a serious offence at the time. He later settled in Hartford, and then prior to 1655, he settled in Norwalk.

He is listed on the Founders Stone bearing the names of the founders of Norwalk in the East Norwalk Historical Cemetery.

References

1634 births
1689 deaths
American Puritans
British servants
English emigrants to British North America
Founding settlers of Norwalk, Connecticut
American indentured servants
People from Dorchester, Dorset